Radu II Praznaglava (Radu II Empty Head/in Old Slavic/), (? – 1428?) was a ruler of Wallachia in the 15th century, ruling for 4 terms, each time preceded by Dan II, his rival for the throne, and each time succeeded by him. Of those 4 periods on the throne of Wallachia, all were within a period of only 7 years, and 3 terms lasted less than a year. He ruled:

 August 1420 – 1422
 summer of 1423
 autumn of 1424
 January – spring of 1427

Son of Mircea cel Batran, he was probably the last voievod of Wallachia to assert control of Banat and southern Basarabia. Dobrogea was lost in 1417.
His short intervals of rulership were marked by frequent and violent clashes with his rival and cousin, Dan II, for the throne of the principality.
He found shelter and military support from the Ottoman Empire, and it was this submission to the Ottomans which ultimately caused Wallachia to lose Dobrogea and other territories.
Radu II is last mentioned in the spring of 1427, when Dan II attacked him from Transylvania, retook the throne, and most probably killed him.

His nickname, as appears in Slavonic writings (Praznaglava), could also be translated as "simple-minded", but the more likely meaning is ”void of hair (bald)”. He is considered an obscure ruler, which placed Wallachia under Ottoman suzerainty.

References 

|-

1427 deaths
Rulers of Wallachia
Year of birth unknown
House of Basarab